Miga Miga Avasaram is a 2019 Tamil language action drama film directed by Suresh Kamatchi, who previously produced Kangaroo. The film stars Sri Priyanka and Harish. The film is based on the gender inequality and harassment faced by female police officers. Sri Priyanka won Norway Tamil Film Festival Awards for Best Actress at Norway Tamil Film Festival Awards in 2020.

Plot

Samandhi is a female cop who has been assigned the task to be a bandobust to a VIP coming from a different country to visit a popular festival in Bhavani Temple, Erode. After waiting for a long time patiently, she desperately feels like answering the nature’s call, but her senior officer makes sure that she goes through hell of a time without allowing her the permission for the same, thanks to his grudge on her.

Cast 

Sri Priyanka as Samandhi
Harish as Samandhi's lover
Sarathy
Vazhakku En Muthuraman as Subharaj
E. Ramdoss as Raj
Linga as Samandhi's uncle
Aandavan Kattalai Aravind as Thileepan
Saravana Sakthi as Shankar
V. K. Sundar as Sundar
S. Vetri Kumaran
Guna
Benjamin as Marimuthu
Kung Fu Arumugam
Kadhal Arun Kumar
Seeman in a special appearance

Plot 

Female police constable Samandhi is forced to stand on a bridge on a hot day at great length while her male superintendent refuses to give her leave to use the toilet. After struggling at length, she eventually wets her trousers in the rain and cries.

Soundtrack 

Ishaan Dev composed the film's soundtrack and director Cheran wrote a song.

Release 
Upon release, Chief Minister Edappadi Palaniswamy viewed the movie and recommended the movie be screened for 200 female police officers.

Reception 
The Times of India gave the film a 2 out of 5 stars stating that "The only takeaway is the decent performance by Sri Priyanka, who managed to convey the harrowing experience women face during such situations". The Deccan Chronicle gave the film two and a half out of five stars and wrote how "The writing could have been better and the length of the movie also plays spoilsport.  Nevertheless, MMA is a well-intentioned film with a message. These small glitches can be overlooked".

Awards and nominations

References

External links 

2019 films
2010s Tamil-language films
Fictional portrayals of the Tamil Nadu Police